Some Racing, Some Stopping is an album by Headlights released on March 6, 2008. The band embarked on a US tour with Evangelicals in support of the album.

Track listing
 "Get Yer Head Around It" - 3:24
 "Cherry Tulips" - 3:28
 "Market Girl" - 3:34
 "On April 2" - 2:36
 "School Boys" - 3:14
 "Some Racing, Some Stopping" - 3:57
 "So Much for the Afternoon" - 3:16
 "Catch Them All" - 2:57
 "Towers" - 2:57
 "January" - 3:49

Trivia
The poster for the European Tour was designed by Berlin-based design studio Zwölf.

References

2008 albums
Polyvinyl Record Co. albums